Ty Glaser (born 12 November 1982) is an English actress, known for her role as Dr. Gemma Wilde on the BBC drama series Holby City. She has also appeared in numerous television series, such as  Secret Diary of a Call Girl, Above Suspicion, The Bill and Emmerdale as Libby Charles. In 2019, she appeared in the Channel 4 drama series Ackley Bridge as Sian Oakes.

Early life
Privately educated, Glaser went on to study the Meisner technique at the Actors' Temple in London. She is also an accomplished dancer.

Filmography

References

External links

English film actresses
Living people
1982 births
21st-century English actresses
English soap opera actresses
English television actresses
Actresses from Hampshire